Eric Felece Curry (born February 3, 1970) is an American football player who was a defensive end in the National Football League (NFL) for seven seasons during the 1990s.  He played college football for the University of Alabama, and earned All-American honors.  A first-round pick in the 1993 NFL Draft, he played professionally for the Tampa Bay Buccaneers, Green Bay Packers and Jacksonville Jaguars of the NFL.

Early years
Curry was born in Thomasville, Georgia.  He graduated from Thomasville High School, and played for the Thomasville High School Bulldogs high school football team.

College career
Curry accepted an athletic scholarship to attend the University of Alabama, where he played for coach Bill Curry and coach Gene Stallings' Alabama Crimson Tide football teams from 1989 to 1992.  As a senior in 1992, Curry was recognized as a consensus first-team All-American and the United Press International Lineman of the Year.  He was a member of the Crimson Tide squad that won the first SEC Championship Game in 1992, and a consensus national championship by defeating the Miami Hurricanes 34–13 in the Sugar Bowl.  Curry and fellow defensive end John Copeland were known as the "bookends" during their time at Alabama, and were key players in the Crimson Tide's No. 1 rated defense in 1992.

Professional career
The Tampa Bay Buccaneers selected Curry in the first round, with the sixth overall pick, of the 1993 NFL Draft. He gained notoriety for happily hugging the NFL Commissioner, Paul Tagliabue, after he was picked by the Buccaneers in the draft. In seven NFL seasons, Curry played in 75 regular season games, started 44 of them, and contributed 95 tackles, 12.5 quarterback sacks, and seven forced fumbles.

NFL statistics

Life after football
, Curry resides in Jacksonville, Florida.

References

1970 births
Living people
Alabama Crimson Tide football players
All-American college football players
American football defensive ends
Tampa Bay Buccaneers players
Jacksonville Jaguars players
People from Thomasville, Georgia
Players of American football from Georgia (U.S. state)
Green Bay Packers players